Club Atlético Sarmiento is an Argentine sports club based in the city of Resistencia in Chaco Province. Although many sports are hosted at the club, Sarmiento is mostly known for its football team, which currently plays in Torneo Argentino B, the regionalised fourth level of the Argentine football league system.

Sarmiento played one season at the highest level of Argentine football, in the Torneo Nacional of 1977. Sarmiento finished 6th out of 8 teams in group C. The highlights of that campaign included a 2–0 win over Racing Club and 1–1 draws with River Plate and eventual finalist Talleres de Córdoba.

Other sports practised at the club are basketball, field hockey, martial arts, swimming, tennis and  volleyball,

Titles
 Torneo Argentino A: 1
 1977

References

External links
Official Club Website 
Official Club 

 
1910 establishments in Argentina
Argentine volleyball teams
Association football clubs established in 1910
Basketball teams in Argentina
Football clubs in Chaco Province
Resistencia, Chaco